The 2015 Varsity Football challenge is the third season of a South African university association football competition. It involves some of the top football playing universities in the country, which belong to the University Sports Company. The tournament is run by Varsity Sports SA, and is endorsed by the South African Football Association and University Sport South Africa.

History
The Varsity Cup tournament was founded in 2008, featuring the rugby teams of eight universities. Varsity Sports was expanded in 2012 to include other sporting codes. University Sport South Africa discussed the Varsity Football proposal at its 2012 annual general meeting. The idea was initially rejected, as it was seen to split the member institutions. However, it was later accepted, and 2013 was the inaugural season of Varsity Football, with an 8 team men's tournament. A four team women's tournament is also being played.

Participating Teams

The eight teams competing in the men's Varsity Football challenge are:

Qualification
Qualification was based on the 2014 University Sports South Africa National Club Championships. In order to qualify, men's teams need to be one of the eight highest placed teams associated with Varsity Sports. Walter Sisulu University did not finish in the top 8, but was invited as the best finishing member of Varsity Sports. The University of Zululand, University of KwaZulu-Natal, Cape Peninsula University of Technology, Central University of Technology, Berea College and Durban University of Technology were all overlooked, as they are not members of Varsity Sports.

Standings

Format
The tournament begins with a round robin stage, in which all teams play each other once. After the round robin stage, the top 4 teams will advance to the knock-out stage. The teams ranked 1 and 2 will host the semi-finals, against the teams ranked 4 and 3 respectively. The winners will advance to the final, to be hosted by the highest ranking finalist. All matches are played on Mondays. The league scoring system follows a standard scoring system and awards 3 points are awarded for a win, and 1 point for a draw. Teams are separated first on points, and then on goal difference.

Round robin stage
The 2015 season began with the round robin stages on 20 July, which will end on 3 September.
 All times are South African (GMT+2)

Week 1

Week 2

Week 3

Knockout stage
The top four placed men's teams progressed to the knockout stage, as did all four women's teams.  The semi-finals for both men and women were played on 10 September and the finals on 24 September.

Sponsors

The tournament is sponsored by:
 Cell C
 Debonairs Pizza
 First National Bank
 Samsung

References

External links 
 http://www.varsitysportssa.com/varsity-football

Football
Soccer competitions in South Africa